Civic Center station is a station on Line 2 and Line 4 of the Shenzhen Metro. Line 4 platforms opened on 28 December 2004 and Line 2 platforms opened on 28 June 2011. It is located under the junction of Fuzhong 3rd Road and Shennan Boulevard in Futian District, Shenzhen, China. It is adjacent to Shenzhen Civic Center.

Station layout

Exits

References

External links
 Shenzhen Metro Civic Center Station (Line 2) (Chinese)
 Shenzhen Metro Civic Center Station (Line 2) (English)
 Shenzhen Metro Civic Center Station (Line 4) (Chinese)
 Shenzhen Metro Civic Center Station (Line 4) (English)

Railway stations in Guangdong
Shenzhen Metro stations
Futian District
Railway stations in China opened in 2004